CNG Processing is a Danish company that provides payment gateway services to merchants.  They offer merchants online services for accepting electronic payments by a variety of payment methods including credit cards. CNG Processing licensed by the Danish Financial Supervisory Authority.

History
The company was founded in 2005 and has been payment card industry compliant since 2006 by Visa and MasterCard. Their acquiring network includes PBS International, Deutsche Bank, Credit Foncier de Monaco, Lloyds Bank, DataCash, American Express and MasterCard, with the company also being a MasterCard independent sales organization or member service provider (ISO/MSP) member.

See also
 E-commerce payment system
 Electronic money
 Payment Card Industry
 Electronic commerce
 Merchant account

References

Payment service providers